Lagarde-Marc-la-Tour is a commune in the Corrèze department in central France. It was established on 1 January 2019 by merger of the former communes of Lagarde-Enval (the seat) and Marc-la-Tour.

See also
Communes of the Corrèze department

References

Communes of Corrèze
Populated places established in 2019
2019 establishments in France